Living in the Background may refer to:
 Living in the Background (album), the debut album of pop group Baltimora
 "Living in the Background" (song), the title track and third single from the album